Sanoop Santhosh (born 12 December 2003) is an Indian actor from the Malayalam film industry.

Sanoop made his acting debut in Philips and the Monkey Pen, a 2013 Malayalam language experimental & children's film. He played the role of Ryan Philip, the movie turned out to be a decent hit.

Sanoop was born to Santhosh and Usha on 12 December 2003 Kozhikode, Poonoor. He attends Sreepuram English Medium And Junior College, Kannur. He is the younger brother of young actress Sanusha.

Filmography

Awards

References

21st-century Indian male child actors
2003 births
Living people
Male actors in Malayalam cinema
Indian male film actors
21st-century Indian male actors
Male actors from Kannur